Vaaraahi Chalana Chitram is a leading Indian film production house that produces Telugu films. It was established by Sai Korrapati.

Film production

Awards

References

External links
 
https://www.facebook.com/Vaaraahi

Film production companies based in Hyderabad, India
Year of establishment missing
Indian film studios